Bibliotheca is a five-volume version of the Bible created by Adam Lewis Greene published in 2016. It was funded in mid 2014 through a thirty-day Kickstarter campaign for which Greene set a goal of $37,000, but the campaign raised over $1.4 million. Greene's aim, as detailed in his Kickstarter campaign video, was to enhance the experience of reading biblical literature by giving the content a more novel-like form, omitting chapter and verse numbers and annotation, utilizing a sewn binding and opaque book paper (rather than Bible paper), and creating original typefaces optimized for legibility, among other features.

Translation 
Bibliotheca features a translation referred to as the American Literary Version (ALV), a new recension of the American Standard Version (ASV). (The ASV was published in 1901 as a revision of the King James Version.) 

The revisions in the ALV pertain mainly to the elimination of Jacobean grammar and vocabulary in the ASV (e.g., “thou” and “doth”), which had been retained from the KJV. After the text had been edited for style, Greene enlisted a group of seven biblical language experts from Oxford, Fuller, Wheaton, Emory, and other reputable institutions to review the text (among them were noted scholars Brent A. Strawn and David A. deSilva) and invited them to make suggestions in light of lexical developments since the publication of the ASV. A project update from Greene in April 2016, featuring a note from deSilva, implies that critical changes were indeed made to the text: “Without damaging the literary quality of the base translation,” writes deSilva, “we were able to suggest many changes that would bring the translation up to par with where textual criticism and Greek lexicography currently stand, not to mention alert Adam to a few all-out mistranslations of the original Hebrew and Greek in the ASV (every translation has them).”

Miscellaneous 
Because the text of Bibliotheca is spread across five volumes, it was possible to utilize a thicker, more opaque paper than the thinner, more translucent paper typical of most Bibles.

Bibliotheca has several features in common with The Books of the Bible (published by Biblica in 2007), which separates the text of the Bible into separate volumes and does not have chapter or verse numbers. However, The Books of the Bible does not include the Apocrypha, nor does it have the same level of production and design quality found in Bibliotheca (e.g. Despite being available in multiple volumes, The Books of the Bible, like traditional Bibles, still features Bible paper, does not have a sewn binding, has narrow margins, and is typeset with a comparatively utilitarian typeface and page layout).

After Greene's 2014 Kickstarter project, evangelical publisher Crossway Books (a division of Good News Publishers) began work on their own high-quality multi-volume Bible set and produced a product similar in style and concept, which was published on October 31, 2016, just weeks before Greene began shipping his final product.   However, Crossway's similar product could be viewed as less ecumenical as it does not include the Apocrypha.

References

External links

2016 non-fiction books
Bible versions and translations
Kickstarter-funded publications